The 1980 Indian general election in Jammu and Kashmir to the 7th Lok Sabha were held for 6 seats. Jammu and Kashmir National Conference won 3 seats, Indian National Congress (I) won 1, Indian National Congress (U) won 1 seat and an independent candidate Phuntsog Namgyal of Ladakh constituency won 1 seat.

Constituency Details

Results

Party-wise Results

List of Elected MPs

See also 

 Elections in Jammu and Kashmir

References 

1980
1980
Jammu